Petrikovce is a village and municipality in Michalovce District in the Kosice Region of eastern Slovakia.

History
In historical records the village was first mentioned in 1411.

Geography
The village lies at an altitude of 103 metres and covers an area of 5.74 km². The municipality has a population of about 220 people.

External links
http://www.statistics.sk/mosmis/eng/run.html

Villages and municipalities in Michalovce District